Ryan Hamilton (born 9 April 1988) was a Canadian rugby union player. He played internationally for the Canadian national side, making 17 appearances, 4 of which came during the 2011 Rugby World Cup. In addition to the national XV side, Hamilton appeared in all 5 matches in the 2008 IRB Junior World Championship for the Canada U20 side in Wales, in which Canada finished eleventh. Hamilton was born in Edmonton, Alberta.

He played as a hooker for all of his career, making his senior Canada debut in 2010 against Uruguay on June 5, 2010. On 2 April 2015, Hamilton announced his retirement from the game, after ten years with Rugby Canada from the Under 17 level to the Senior Men’s Team.

References

External links
ESPN Profile

1988 births
Canada international rugby union players
Canadian rugby union players
Living people
Rugby union hookers
Sportspeople from Edmonton